Wyoming v. Houghton, 526 U.S. 295 (1999), is a United States Supreme Court case which held that absent exigency, the warrantless search of a passenger's container capable of holding the object of a search for which there is probable cause is not a violation of the Fourth Amendment to the United States Constitution, because it is justified under the automobile exception as an effect of the car.

Background
In Houghton, the Supreme Court was confronted with the question of whether the scope of a vehicle exception search included a passenger's purse. The car had been stopped by a police officer for a faulty brake light, and the driver was promptly observed to have a syringe in his shirt pocket. He admitted he used it to shoot up. A backup police car soon arrived, and the passengers were ordered out of the car. Ms. Houghton gave a false name. While looking through her purse, an officer found her driver's license and, thus, her real name. Continuing the search, the officer found a syringe with 60 ccs of methamphetamine. Looking at her arms, he saw fresh needle tracks. She was arrested.
 
The trial court denied her motion to suppress and she was convicted. On appeal, the Wyoming Supreme Court reversed because the officers lacked probable cause to search her purse simply based on the driver's possession of a syringe.

Opinion of the Court 
The Supreme Court reversed, 6–3. Justice Scalia, writing for the majority, stated that all Fourth Amendment inquiries look first to the intent of the Framers of the Constitution. If that does not provide an answer, then "we must evaluate the search or seizure under traditional standards of reasonableness by assessing, on the one hand, the degree to which it intrudes upon an individual's privacy and, on the other, the degree to which it is needed for the promotion of legitimate governmental interests."
 
Looking to Carroll v. United States, the first automobile exception case from 1925, the Court found there that the Framers would hold that the whole car could be searched if there was probable cause to believe it contained contraband. Likewise, the Court opined in United States v. Ross that the Carroll doctrine permitted searches of all containers found in a vehicle there was probable cause to search.
 
Going one step further, however, the Court held that even if the historical perspective was not enough, a "balancing of the relative interests weigh decidedly in favor of allowing searches of passenger's belongings" because of the reduced expectation of privacy in and the mobility of automobiles. Also, passengers in cars are more likely engaged in a common enterprise with the driver and "have the same interest in concealing the fruits or the evidence of their wrongdoing." Also, their proximity enables them "to hide contraband in [each other's] belongings as readily as in other containers in the car ... perhaps even surreptitiously, without the passenger's knowledge or permission." While these factors will not always be present, "the balancing of interests must be conducted with an eye to the generality of cases." Thus, specific probable cause to the container was not required.

Dissent 
Justice Stevens, the author of Ross, dissented with Justices Souter and Ginsburg. He found that precedent did not dictate the result, and he noted that Ross "categorically rejected the notion that the scope of a warrantless search of a vehicle might be 'defined by the nature of the container in which the contraband is secreted. ... Rather, it is defined by the object of the search and the places in which there is probable cause to believe that it may be found.'" Since there was no dispute there was no probable cause to believe that Houghton's purse contained contraband, the search should have been suppressed.
 
The dissenters also disagreed with an effective presumption that persons in a vehicle would be holding each other's evidence or contraband.
 
Finally, the dissenters disagreed with elevating law enforcement interests over privacy concerns and that the "two-step Fourth Amendment approach wherein the privacy and governmental interests at stake must be considered only if 18th-century common law 'yields no answer'" because nothing cited by the Court mandated that approach and the Court did address the contemporary privacy interests involved. Indeed, United States v. Di Re dictated that Carroll did not permit a search of a passenger where there was no probable cause.

See also 
 Arkansas v. Sanders, 
 California v. Greenwood, 
 Carroll v. United States (1925)

References

External links 
 

United States Supreme Court cases
United States Supreme Court cases of the Rehnquist Court
United States Fourth Amendment case law
1999 in United States case law